The women's field hockey tournament at the 2011 Pan American Games was held between 19–28 October 2011 in Guadalajara, Mexico. The tournament doubled as the qualification to the 2012 Summer Olympics to be held in London, Great Britain.

The United States won the tournament after defeating Argentina 4–2 in the final, obtaining their first title and ending Argentina's streak of six consecutive titles since the women's tournament was included in the Pan American Games in 1987.

Qualification
Every country in the Pan American Hockey Federation had the opportunity to qualify through a regional tournament except the two North American countries as they did not participate in them. Taking that into consideration, it was decided to allow two teams not already qualified through regional tournaments to qualify for the Pan American Games based on final rankings in the 2009 Pan American Cup. Along with the automatically qualified host nation, the eighth participating country was decided in a three test-match series between Cuba (who did not participate in the 2010 Central American and Caribbean Games) and Jamaica (who would have qualified in the third qualifying position from the 2009 Pan American Cup)

Competition format
Eight teams competed in both the men's and women's Pan American Games hockey tournaments with the competition consisting of two rounds.
In the first round, teams were divided into two pools of four teams, and play followed round robin format with each of the teams playing all other teams in the pool once.  Teams were awarded three points for a win, one point for a draw and zero points for a loss.

Following the completion of the pool games, teams placing first and second in each pool advanced to a single elimination round consisting of two semifinal games, and the bronze and gold medal games. Remaining teams competed in classification matches to determine their ranking in the tournament. During these matches, extra time of 7½ minutes per half was played if teams were tied at the end of regulation time. During extra time, play followed golden goal rules with the first team to score declared the winner. If no goals were scored during extra time, a penalty stroke competition took place.

Umpires
Below are the 12 umpires appointed by the Pan American Hockey Federation:

Arely Castellanos (MEX)
Cheng Hong (TPE)
Carolina de la Fuente (ARG)
Kelly Hudson (NZL)
Stephanie Judefind (USA)
Ayanna McClean (TTO)
Carol Metchette (IRL)
Catalina Montesino Wenzel (CHI)
Maritza Pérez Castro (URU)
Wendy Stewart (CAN)
Suzzane Sutton (USA)
Carolina Villafañe (ARG)

Results
All times are Central Daylight Time (UTC−05:00)

First round

Pool A

Pool B

Classification

Crossover

Seventh and eighth place

Fifth and sixth place

Medal round

Semi-finals

Bronze medal match

Gold medal match

Final standings

Goalscorers

Medalists

References

External links
Official website
Official PAHF website

Women's tournament
Pan American Games
2011 Pan American Games
Pan American Games
2011